The FIBA Hall of Fame, or FIBA Basketball Hall of Fame, honors players, coaches, teams, referees, and administrators who have greatly contributed to international competitive basketball. It was established by FIBA, in 1991. It includes the "Samaranch Library", the largest basketball library in the world, that as of 2007, had over 10,000 basketball books, and 950 magazines, from over 65 countries. The FIBA Hall of Fame building is a basketball museum built in Alcobendas, Community of Madrid, Spain, by the Pedro Ferrándiz Foundation.

Initially, induction ceremonies occurred every two years, with the first one taking place in 2007. The pattern was interrupted in 2010, when a class was inducted on the day of the 2010 FIBA World Championship's Final in Istanbul. After that, no induction took place until 2013, with a class announced in May of that year, with induction taking place on 19 June. The next induction class was in 2015, and after that, more classes were inducted in 2016, 2017, and 2019.

Inductees

See also 
 FIBA Order of Merit
 FIBA's 50 Greatest Players (1991)
 Naismith Memorial Basketball Hall of Fame
 List of members of the Naismith Memorial Basketball Hall of Fame
 List of players in the Naismith Memorial Basketball Hall of Fame
 List of coaches in the Naismith Memorial Basketball Hall of Fame
 EuroLeague Legend
 College Basketball Hall of Fame
 Women's Basketball Hall of Fame
 VTB United League Hall of Fame
 Italian Basketball Hall of Fame
 French Basketball Hall of Fame
 Finnish Basketball Hall of Fame
 Australian Basketball Hall of Fame
 Philippine Basketball Association Hall of Fame

References

External links
FIBA Hall of Fame Official website
Official Inductee List

1991 establishments in Spain
Sport in Alcobendas
Awards established in 1991
Hall
Basketball museums and halls of fame
 
Halls of fame in Spain
Museums in the Community of Madrid
Sports museums in Spain